Sedna Planitia is a large lowland area of Venus, south of Ishtar Terra. 
It is thought to be lava-covered and similar to a lunar mare.  Its name is derived from the Inuit sea goddess.

References

Surface features of Venus
Volcanism on Venus